is one of four wards of Okayama, Okayama Prefecture, Japan. The ward has an area of 160.28 km² and a population of 96,718. The population density is 603 per square kilometer. The name means "East Ward."

The wards of Okayama were established when Okayama became a city designated by government ordinance on April 1, 2009.

External links 

 岡山市東区役所 (Ward office official home page)

Wards of Okayama